Thomas Paulsley LaBeff (July 20, 1935 – December 26, 2019), known professionally as Sleepy LaBeef, was an American singer and musician.

Early life

LaBeef was born in Smackover, Arkansas, the youngest of 10 children. The family name was originally LaBoeuf. He was raised on a farm growing cotton and watermelons, and received the nickname "Sleepy" because he had a lazy eye.

LaBeef became a fan of George Jones, Bill Monroe, and Sister Rosetta Tharpe. He learned guitar, and moved to Houston, Texas, when he was 18. There, he sang gospel music on local radio and put together a bar band to play venues as well as radio programs such as the Houston Jamboree and Louisiana Hayride.

Career
In the 1950s, as the rockabilly component of rock and roll became evident, LaBeef began recording singles in the genre, initially credited as Sleepy LaBeff or Tommy LaBeff. His first, "I'm Through", was issued on Starday Records in 1957.

In 1964, he moved to Nashville and moved to a more solidly country style, recording singles for Columbia Records. His first genuine hit was 1968's "Every Day", which peaked at No. 73 on the U.S. Billboard Country chart. After moving to Plantation Records in 1969, he scored a second hit in 1971 with "Blackland Farmer", which charted at No. 67. He also played the role of the Swamp Thing in Ron Ormond's 1968 B-movie, The Exotic Ones (also known as The Monster and the Stripper).

LaBeef transferred to Sun Records in the 1970s and continued releasing albums and touring widely; his popularity faded in the United States but rose in Europe. The 1980s saw him sign to Rounder Records, where he released albums into the 1990s.

As a musician, he was noted for his extensive repertoire, and for his live performances, at one time undertaking some 300 performances a year. He described the music he performed as "...root music: old-time rock-and-roll, Southern gospel and hand-clapping music, black blues, Hank Williams-style country. We mix it up real good." He toured regularly in Europe, and performed at many music festivals both in Europe and the US. In January 2012, LaBeef traveled to Nashville to record and film a live concert and record in historic RCA Studio B, all produced by noted bassist Dave Pomeroy. A documentary/concert DVD, Sleepy LaBeef Rides Again and the soundtrack CD was released on April 22, 2013, by Earwave Records. His last performance was in September 2019.

He had heart bypass surgery in 2003. He died at his home in Siloam Springs, Arkansas on December 26, 2019, at age 84.

Discography

Singles

Albums 
 1974: The Bull’s Night Out
 1976: Western Gold
 1978: Rockabilly 1977 (Sun Records)
 1978: Beefy Rockabilly
 1979: Early, Rare and Rockin’ Sides
 1979: Downhome Rockabilly (Sun Records)
 1979: Downhome Rockabilly (Charly Records, UK)
 1979: Rockabilly Heavyweight (with Dave Travis)
 1979 "Sleepin' in Spain" (AUVI records, Spain)
 1979: Sleepy LaBeef and Friends (Ace Records)
 1979: Sleepy LaBeef and Friends (Ace-Chiswick Records)
 1980: Early, Rare and Rockin’ Sides (re-release)
 1980: Downhome Rockabilly (re-release)
 1981: It Ain’t What You Eat, It's the Way How You Chew It (Rounder Records)
 1982: Electricity (Rounder Records)
 1987: Nothin’ But The Truth (Rounder Records) [live]
 1994: Strange Things Happen
 1995: The Human Jukebox (Rounder Records)
 1996: I’ll Never Lay My Guitar Down (Rounder Records)
 1996: Larger Than Life (6 CD-Box, compilation)
 1997: A Rockin’ Decade
 1999: Flyin’ Saucer Rock’n’Roll: The Very Best Of Sleepy LaBeef
 1999: The Bulls’s Ride Out & Western Gold
 2000: Tomorrow Never Comes
 2001: Rockabilly Blues
 2001: Road Warrior
 2003: Johnny's Blues: A Tribute To Johnny Cash (Northern Blues)
 2008: Roots (Ponk Media)
 2008: Sleepy Rocks (Bear Family anthology)
 2012: Rides Again

References

1935 births
2019 deaths
American rockabilly musicians
American country singer-songwriters
Singer-songwriters from Arkansas
Starday Records artists
Columbia Records artists
Sun Records artists
Charly Records artists
Rounder Records artists
People from Smackover, Arkansas
Country musicians from Arkansas